National Living Treasure is a status created and occasionally updated by the National Trust of Australia's New South Wales branch, awarded to up to 100 living people. Recipients were selected by popular vote for having made outstanding contributions to Australian society in any field of human endeavour.

History 
In 1997, the National Trust of Australia (NSW) called for nominations from the public for 100 Australian Living Treasures, and each nomination was counted as one vote. The nominees had to be living and had to have made a substantial and enduring contribution. The choice of those who were named as National Living Treasures was made by more than 10,000 Australians voting. Their votes determined who was chosen. The first list of 100 Living Treasures was published in 1997. Phillip Adams, himself named as a National Treasure, gave his own opinion in an article on ANZAC Day in 2015 that when the list was first published in 1997, most were amused to find they were nominated; he suggested an alternative list to "celebrate those who make us happy". 

In 2004, the list was refreshed with 15 new names, following the deaths of some people on the list and the exclusion of former Justice Marcus Einfeld who was imprisoned subsequent to his retirement for perjury and perverting the course of justice relative to a speeding ticket, following an identical process to that used in 1997 – a public nomination and vote.

On 23 January 2012, the National Trust of Australia (NSW) joined with Woman's Day magazine to launch a nationwide search for seven new National Living Treasures. They were announced, amid controversy, on 4 March 2012, when the National Trust refused to endorse the NSW branch's listing of the mining magnate Clive Palmer as one of the members. Graeme Blackman, the chairman of the Australian Council of National Trusts, said that "I am telling you, as the chairman, it is not auspiced by the National Trust nationally." However, the next day it was reported that "trust president Ian Carroll said the titles recognised that the country's culture was more than just our buildings and natural heritage." It was later revealed that the vote for Palmer had been manipulated, with a number of internal emails having been sent to his company's staff, their family and friends, urging that they vote for "Professor Clive Palmer".

On 30 July 2014, the board of the National Trust of Australia (NSW) voted to remove Rolf Harris from the list after his conviction on 12 charges of indecent assault between 1969 and 1986 and to also withdraw the award. Harris had been among the original 100 Australians selected for the honour in 1997.

Current list
The 73 still-living people on the 2014 list which originally contained 93 living people:

 Phillip Adams, humanist, social commentator
 Dame Marie Bashir, Governor of New South Wales, professor
 John Bell, actor
 Geoffrey Blainey, professor, historian
 Raelene Boyle, Olympic runner, sports commentator
 Frank Brennan, social commentator
 Bob Brown, politician, Australian Greens activist
 Julian Burnside, barrister, refugee rights advocate, author
 Tim Costello, social activist, commentator
 Bill Crews, social activist
 Russell Crowe, actor
 Judy Davis, actress
 Sir William Deane, High Court judge and Governor-General of Australia
 Ernie Dingo, Indigenous Australian television personality
 Mick Dodson, Indigenous Australian leader
 Pat Dodson, Indigenous Australian activist/leader, politician
 Peter Doherty, immunologist, professor, Nobel Prize winner
 Ted Egan, musician, activist, administrator
 Herb Elliott, Olympic runner
 John Farnham, entertainer
 Dawn Fraser, Olympic swimmer, politician
 Ian Frazer, scientist
 Cathy Freeman, Indigenous Australian sportsperson, Olympic runner
 Peter Garrett, politician, singer and social activist
 Jennie George, Australian Council of Trade Unions leader, politician
 Evonne Goolagong Cawley, Indigenous Australian tennis player
 Shane Gould, Olympic swimmer
 Germaine Greer, writer, social activist
 John Hatton, independent NSW politician
 Peter Hollingworth, Archbishop of Brisbane, Governor-General
 Gabi Hollows, social activist, philanthropist
 Janet Holmes à Court, business leader, philanthropist
 John Howard, politician, Prime Minister
 Barry Humphries, entertainer
 Barry Jones, politician, author, polymath
 Paul Keating, Prime Minister
 Thomas Keneally, writer
 Cheryl Kernot, politician
 Nicole Kidman, actress
 Michael Kirby, lawyer, judge, social commentator
 Karl Kruszelnicki, scientist, author, media personality
 Rod Laver, tennis player
 Michael Leunig, cartoonist, social commentator
 David Malouf, novelist
 Garry McDonald, actor
 Walter Mikac, survivors' advocate
 Kylie Minogue, singer, actress
 Graeme Murphy, dancer, choreographer
 John Newcombe, tennis player, television commentator
 Greg Norman, golfer, businessman
 Sir Gustav Nossal, scientist, administrator
 Lowitja O'Donoghue, Indigenous Australian leader
 Pat O'Shane, magistrate, Indigenous Australian leader
 Clive Palmer, mining magnate, placed on list after his staff were instructed to vote for him
 Mary Paton, founder of the Nursing Mothers' Association
 Noel Pearson, Indigenous Australian leader
 Kieren Perkins, Olympic swimmer, television commentator
 Pat Rafter, tennis player
 Henry Reynolds, historian
 Ken Rosewall, tennis player
 Dick Smith, businessman, social commentator
 Fiona Stanley, physician
 Richard Tognetti, violinist and conductor
 Anthony Warlow, singer
 Gai Waterhouse, racehorse trainer
 Steve Waugh, cricketer
 Robyn Williams, science broadcaster
 David Williamson, playwright
 Tim Winton, novelist
 Fiona Wood, physician
 Roger Woodward, pianist
 John Yu, medical doctor
 Galarrwuy Yunupingu, Indigenous Australian leader

Deceased

Betty Archdale, cricketer, educator (d. 2000)
Faith Bandler, academic, activist and advocate (d. 2015)
Nancy Bird Walton, aviator (d. 2009)
Arthur Boyd, artist (d. 1999)
Sir Jack Brabham, world champion Formula One driver (d. 2014)
Sir Don Bradman, cricketer (d. 2001)
Don Burrows, jazz musician (d. 2020)
Harry Butler, naturalist and conservationist (d. 2015)
Ruth Cracknell, theatre, film and television actress (d. 2002)
Bart Cummings, racehorse trainer (d. 2015)
Betty Cuthbert, Olympic runner (d. 2017)
Sir Roden Cutler, World War II hero, Governor of New South Wales (d. 2002)
Don Dunstan, Premier of South Australia, social commentator (d. 1999)
Slim Dusty, singer, entertainer (d. 2003)
Malcolm Fraser, former Prime Minister of Australia (d. 2015)
Margaret Fulton, writer, food expert (d. 2019)
Catherine Hamlin, physician (d. 2020)
Hazel Hawke, social activist (d. 2013)
Basil Hetzel, medical researcher, public health advocate (d. 2017)
Donald Horne, academic, writer, author of The Lucky Country (d. 2005)
Robert Hughes, art critic, author (d. 2012)
Elizabeth Jolley, author (d. 2007)
Caroline Jones, television personality, social commentator (d. 2022)
Ian Kiernan, businessman, social activist (d. 2018)
Dame Leonie Kramer, academic, businesswoman (d. 2016)
John Landy, Olympic athlete, Governor of Victoria (d. 2022)
Jimmy Little, Indigenous Australian singer (d. 2012)
Ted Mack, politician, social commentator (d. 2018)
Edward (Ted) Matthews, World War I soldier and last Gallipoli survivor (d. 1997)
Colleen McCullough, author, writer (d. 2015)
Jack Mundey, trade union leader (d. 2020)
Les Murray, poet (d. 2019)
Dame Olivia Newton-John, singer, actress (d. 2022)
Sir Mark Oliphant, physicist, Governor of South Australia (d. 2000)
Margaret Olley, artist (d. 2011)
Charles Perkins, Indigenous Australian leader (d. 2000)
Peter Sculthorpe, musician, composer (d. 2014)
Mum Shirl Smith, Indigenous Australian activist (d. 1998)
Dame Joan Sutherland, opera singer (d. 2010)
Mavis Taylor, humanitarian (d. 2007)
Tom Uren, politician (d. 2015)
Sir Alan Walker, social commentator/activist (d. 2003)
Morris West, author (d. 1999)
Gough Whitlam, former Prime Minister (d. 2014)
Margaret Whitlam, social activist (d. 2012)
R. M. Williams, businessman (d. 2003)
Judith Wright, poet (d. 2000)

Removed while living
Marcus Einfeld, former judge; removed 2008
Rolf Harris, entertainer; removed 2014

Related lists
 Western Australia's Department of Culture and the Arts has a list of State Living Treasures awarded in 1998, 2004, and 2015 to "honour influential elders of the artistic community", "acknowledge the ability of artists to engage, move, involve and entertain audiences. They honour the skill, imagination and originality of the artist" and "honour those artists whose lifetime work has enhanced the artistic and cultural life of Western Australia, providing inspiration for other artists and enriching the community."

References

External links
National Trust of Australia (NSW)

Lists of Australian people